Jach'a K'uchu (Aymara jach'a big, k'uchu corner, "big corner", also named Jachcha Khuchu, Jachcha Kuchu) is a  mountain in a volcanic field in the Cordillera Occidental of Bolivia northeast of the Chullkani volcano. It is located in the Oruro Department, Sajama Province, Turco Municipality. Jach'a K'uchu is one of five mountains which belong to the so-called Jitiri Dome.

References 

Mountains of Oruro Department
Volcanoes of Oruro Department